Juhan Luiga (31 March 1873 – 19 October 1927) was an Estonian psychiatrist, physician, author, publicist, and politician. He was a member of I Riigikogu.

Career
Juhan Luiga was born in Ropka in 1873. He attended primary and secondary schools in Tartu. In 1899, he graduated from the Faculty of Medicine of the University of Tartu. In 1904, he became one of the first
Estonian psychiatrists, Doctor of Medicine.  From 1899 until 1908, he worked as an assistant at the Nervous and Mental Diseases Clinic of the University of Tartu. From 1908 until 1927, he worked in private practice in Tallinn, as well as a city and school physician. 

During World War I, he worked as a military doctor. From 1917–1918, he was in Finland, as the chief marshal of the liaison detachment of the Estonian division. In 1918, he was also the chief marshal in the Estonian Army for a period of several months. Luiga participated as a volunteer in the Estonian War of Independence as a military physician. In 1919 he was elected dean of the University of Tartu's Faculty of Medicine, but refused to accept the position.

Luiga was elected as a member of the first composition of the Riigikogu, representing the Estonian Labour Party. From 1921 until 1927, he was the chairman of the Union of Estonian Medical Associations. Luiga was also among the founders of magazine Eesti Arst and a founder of the Estonian Health Care Museum. During his career, he published writings on psychiatry, religious psychology of the Finno-Ugric peoples, ancient Estonian religion, Estonian history, and modern politics.

Personal life and death
In 1913, Luiga married actress and stage director Erna Villmer. The couple had no children and divorced in 1923.

Juhan Luiga died of a stroke in Tallinn in 1927, aged 54, and was interred at Raadi cemetery in Tartu. His granite headstone was designed by artist Jaan Koort.

References

1873 births
1927 deaths
Estonian psychiatrists
Members of the Riigikogu, 1920–1923
Estonian Labour Party politicians
Estonian military personnel of the Estonian War of Independence
University of Tartu alumni
People from Tartu
Politicians from Tartu
Burials at Raadi cemetery